The iris sphincter muscle (pupillary sphincter, pupillary constrictor, circular muscle of iris, circular fibers) is a muscle in the part of the eye called the iris. It encircles the pupil of the iris, appropriate to its function as a constrictor of the pupil.

Comparative anatomy
This structure is found in vertebrates and in some cephalopods.

General structure
All the myocytes are of the smooth muscle type.

Its dimensions are about 0.75 mm wide by 0.15 mm thick.

Mode of action
In humans, it functions to constrict the pupil in bright light (pupillary light reflex) or during accommodation. In lower animals, the muscle cells themselves are photosensitive causing iris action without brain input.

Innervation
It is controlled by parasympathetic fibers of the muscarinic acetylcholine receptor (M3) that originate from the Edinger–Westphal nucleus, travel along the oculomotor nerve (CN III), synapse in the ciliary ganglion, and then enter the eye through the short ciliary nerves.. The short ciliary nerves then run forward and pierce the sclera at the back of the eye, traveling between the sclera and the choroid to innervate the iris sphincter muscle.

See also
Iris dilator muscle
Miosis

References

External links
Overview of function at tedmontgomery.com
Slide at mscd.edu

Human iris
Muscular system